Quatro por Quatro is a Brazilian-produced telenovela, shown at seven o'clock PM on the TV Globo. It began on 24 October 1994 and ended on 22 July 1995. It consists of 233 episodes. It was written by Carlos Lombardi and directed by Ricardo Waddington, Alexandre Avancini and Luiz Henrique Rios.

Synopsis
A traffic accident causes four women's destinies to intertwine. In the series, the four enter a pact of revenge against the men who hit them and caused them to suffer. Auxiliadora struggled to help her husband Alcebíades prosper, but  when he leaves her for a younger woman, is thrown out of the house. The shy Tatiana was engaged to Fortunato, who failed to show up at their wedding. The Babalu hurricane caught mechanic Raí in bed with another woman. Abigail, a preppy psychologist who is struggling in a failing marriage, decides superficially to continue it but revolts against her husband, Gustavo, who humiliates her in public at a congress. Gustavo has custody of Ângela, a girl who longs to know her true father, Bruno. Her mother died in the childbirth, traumatizing him.

Cast
Elizabeth Savalla - Auxiliadora Fontes ("Condessa" Carmen Almodóvar / Maria do Socorro)
Cristiana Oliveira - Tatiana Tarantino (Maria das Dores Santanna / Raio de Sol)
Betty Lago - Abigail Rossine / Bibi (Calpúrnia/ Pupu / Sharon)
Letícia Spiller - Barbarela Lourdes de Almeida (Babalu)
Humberto Martins - Dr. Bruno Herrera Franco
Marcello Novaes - Raimundo Schillatti (Raí)
Marcos Paulo - Dr. Gustavo Rossini
Tato Gabus Mendes - Alcebíades Augusto Fontes (Alce)
Diogo Vilela - Fortunato
Helena Ranaldi - Mércia Arruda Franco / Suzana Sales
Tatyane Goulart - Ângela Sales Herrera Franco
Tássia Camargo - Maria Bataglia
Marcelo Serrado - Danilo de Almeida
Márcia Real - Isadora Herrera Franco
Daniel Dantas - Celso Herrera Franco
Bianca Byington - Elizabeth Herrera Franco (Beth)
Kadu Moliterno - Samuel Spadafora / Samuca Espada
Françoise Forton - Clarisse
Lizandra Souto - Elisa Maria
Nina de Pádua -  Dra. Fabíola
Bete Mendes - Dona Fátima
Jorge Dória - Seu Santinho
Marcelo Faria - Ralado (Gustavo Rossini Júnior) 
Paulo César Grande - Thiago
Rômulo Arantes - Pedrão
Drica Moraes - Denise
Leonardo Vieira - Vinícius Loducca
Luana Piovani - Duda (Maria Eduarda Ferreira da Rocha)
Paulo Guarnieri - Átila Fontes
Estelita Bell - Eugenia
Renata Fronzi - Vânia
Oswaldo Loureiro - Olegário
Geórgia Gomide - Laura
Mário Lago - Henrique Pessoa
Suely Franco - Calpúrnia Fontes
Neuza Borges - Teresa
Inês Galvão - Marta Rocha
Henri Pagnoncelli - delegado Soares
Íris Bustamante - Silvia
Bete Mendes - Fatima
Hugo Gross - Leandro
Jorge Pontual - Gui
Fabiana Ramos - Paula
Karla Muga - Daniela
Eduardo Caldas - Dinho
Luciana Coutinho - Norma Shirley
Alexandre Salcedo - Alexandre
Alberto Baruque - Tufik
Ana Maria Folly - Elzinha
Luíza Curvo - Renata
Ingrid Fridmann - Ju
Christine Fernandes - Ralado's girlfriend
Fernanda Nobre - Lolô
Nestor de Montemar - Carlos Magno

Prizes
Prize With you! (1995)
 best actor - Humberto Martins 
 best newactress - Letícia Spiller

Trophy the Press (1994)
 newcomer - Betty Lago

External links
The novel in Portugal
Impudent Abígail

1994 telenovelas
1994 Brazilian television series debuts
1995 Brazilian television series endings
Brazilian telenovelas
TV Globo telenovelas
Portuguese-language telenovelas